Following is a result of results from the 2002–03 AFC Champions League qualification rounds.  The league was the 22nd edition of the top-level Asian club football tournament and the 1st edition under the current AFC Champions League title.

Qualifying Zone 1 (West)

Round 1

 

|}

 1. Al Nasr withdrew 
2. Al Aqsa withdrew

Round 2

|}

 1. Köpetdag Aşgabat withdrew citing financial difficulties. 
2. AFC did not accept the participation of Busaiteen and Riffa as neither team met sportive qualification criteria. 
3. Khujand disqualified following suspension of Tajik FA by FIFA and AFC.

Round 3

|}

 1. Regar-TadAZ disqualified following suspension of Tajik FA by FIFA and AFC. 
2. Al-Quds withdrew due to insecure situation in Palestine.

Round 4

|}

1. Al Arabi withdrew.

Qualifying Zone 2 (East)

Round 2

|}

Round 3

|}

Round 4

|}

Qualified teams

West
 Esteghlal
 Pirozi
 Al-Talaba
 Al Sadd
 Al-Hilal
 Nisa Asgabat
 Al Ain
 Pakhtakor

East
 Dalian Shide
 Shanghai Shenhua
 Shimizu S-Pulse
 Kashima Antlers
 Daejeon Citizen
 Seongnam Ilhwa Chunma
 Osotsapa FC
 BEC Tero Sasana

Qual